Coenonympha hero, the scarce heath, is a butterfly species belonging to the family Nymphalidae. It can be found in Central Europe, Northern Europe and North Asia. It resembles Coenonympha arcania.

The butterflies fly in one generation from May to July.

The larvae feed on various grasses.

External links

Vlindernet 
Butterflies of Europe

Coenonympha
Butterflies of Europe
Butterflies described in 1761
Taxa named by Carl Linnaeus